The swimming competition at the 1951 Mediterranean Games was held in Alexandria, Egypt.

Results

Medallists

Men's events

Medal table

References
Complete 1951 Mediterranean Games report released by the International Mediterranean Games Committee

Mediterranean Games
Sports at the 1951 Mediterranean Games
1951